Conrad II (September or October 1052, in Regensburg – 10 April 1055, in Regensburg), called the Child, was the duke of Bavaria from 1054 to 1055. He was the second son of the Emperor Henry III and his second wife, Agnes of Poitou. He was briefly appointed duke of Bavaria, which had been held by his elder brother Henry. He died soon after and was replaced by Henry.

If Conrad I is not numbered (because of his alternative name Cuno), Conrad the Child is sometimes numbered Conrad I.

1052 births
1055 deaths
11th-century dukes of Bavaria
Sons of emperors
Sons of kings
Monarchs who died as children